Major-General Hugh Sutlej Gough  (4 February 1848 – 1920) was a British Army officer who became Lieutenant Governor of Jersey.

Military career
Gough joined the Royal Navy in 1862 and then transferred to 10th Royal Hussars in 1868. He was appointed aide-de-camp to the Commander-in-Chief, India in 1876 and then served in Afghanistan and Egypt before commanding 3rd Mounted Rifles for the Bechuanaland expedition in 1884. He became commanding officer of 18th Royal Hussars in 1889 and assistant adjutant for cavalry in 1893 before being made Lieutenant Governor of Jersey in 1904 and retiring in 1910.

On retirement he was given the colonelcy of the 20th Hussars, a post he held until his death in 1920.

He lived at Llechweddygarth Hall in Montgomeryshire. He was also deputy lieutenant of Caernarvonshire.

Family
In 1886, he married Beatrice Sophia Henning; they had a son and a daughter.

References

1848 births
1920 deaths
Companions of the Order of the Bath
Companions of the Order of St Michael and St George
British Army major generals
Governors of Jersey
10th Royal Hussars officers
18th Royal Hussars officers
Deputy Lieutenants of Caernarvonshire